Anton Brender is a member of the Cercle des économistes.

He is also a professor at the Paris Dauphine University, and Chief Economist for the Belgian-French financial institution Candriam.

Works
 Les Taux d'intérêt : approche empirique, avec F. Pisani, Economica, 1997
 Le Nouvel âge de l'économie américaine, avec F. Pisani, Economica, 1999
 Les marchés et la croissance, avec F. Pisani, Economica, 2001
 Face aux marchés, la politique, La Découverte, 2002
 2e édition, La France face aux marchés financiers, La Découverte, 2004
 La nouvelle économie américaine, avec F. Pisani, Economica, 2004
 La France face à la mondialisation, La Découverte, 2004
 Les déséquilibres financiers internationaux, avec F. Pisani, 2007
 Money, Finance, and the Real Economy: What Has Gone Wrong? with F. Pisani, E. Gagna, Centre for European Policy Studies, 2015

References

External links
A discussion with Anton Brender, "The economist and the public debate", on the magazine site Labyrinth.
Anton Brender page at Candriam

Living people
French economists
Year of birth missing (living people)
Place of birth missing (living people)